Gérard Caussé (born 26 June 1948, Toulouse, France) is a French violist. 

He gave the first performance of the celebrated Ainsi la nuit quartet by Henri Dutilleux. The first movement of Gérard Grisey's celebrated work, Les Espaces Acoustiques ("Prologue"), is inscribed "à Gérard Caussé."  His discography amounts to thirty recordings.  Gerard Caussé plays a viola made by Gasparo da Salo in 1560.

Career
Caussé has shared the stage in both orchestral and chamber music with musicians such as Augustin Dumay, Emmanuel Krivine, Charles Dutoit, and Kent Nagano.

His recordings include more than thirty-five issued under labels such as EMI, Erato and Philips. Caussé is holder of the Banco Bilbao Vizcaya Argentaria Chair of Viola at the Escuela Superior de Música Reina Sofía.

References

1948 births
Living people
French classical violists
French music educators
Musicians from Toulouse
Academic staff of the Reina Sofía School of Music
Erato Records artists